Toker may refer to:

One who smokes cannabis (slang)
Toker (rapper), a member of the Chicano rap group Brownside

Surname
Cem Toker (born 1957), leader of the Liberal Democratic Party in Turkey
Franklin Toker (1944–2021), professor of the History of Art and Architecture
Irfan Toker (born 1972), Turkish judoka
Metin Toker (1924-2002), Turkish journalist and writer

Other uses
Toker Dam, located in Eritrea

Turkish-language surnames